Nathaniel Shaw is an American theatre director, choreographer, and actor. He began his career as a dancer with the Paul Taylor Dance Company and later became the founding and artistic director of The Active Theater in New York. He was Associate Choreographer for the Broadway production and first national tour of Once (musical)  In 2015 he became the Development Director for the Tony and Olivier Award-winning producers, Glass Half Full Productions. In July 2016, he became Artistic Director of Virginia Repertory Theatre in Richmond. In October 2021, Shaw launched The New Theatre, dedicated to advancing artform and industry, with a primary focus on new play development.

Early life 
Shaw was born in Menlo Park, California, the son of modern dancers Cliff Keuter and Elina Mooney. He received a BA in Musical Theater from the University of Northern Colorado.

Career 
From 2004 - 2006, Shaw was a dancer with the Paul Taylor Dance Company. Featured roles included Mercuric Tidings, Lost Found Lost, Arden Court, Sea to Shining Sea, and many others. He originated roles in Spring Rounds and Banquet of Vultures.

In 2007 he played Will Parker alongside Kelli O'Hara and Will Chase in the production of Oklahoma! that was presented by Lyric Theatre of Oklahoma City for the centennial of statehood.

He was a founder and the artistic director for The Active Theater, which had its inaugural season in 2009 and an inaugural gala featuring performances by Tony Award-winner David Hyde Pierce, Tony Award-winner Chuck Cooper and Tony Award-nominee Dee Hoty. During his six seasons there, he directed the first New York City revival of The Violet Hour, and the production was nominated for an Innovative Theater Award for Best Revival. He also directed the world premieres of Bridgeboy and Body Language.

In 2013, he became an Associate Choreographer for Tony Award-nominee Steven Hoggett during the Broadway production of Once. In addition to the Broadway run, Shaw worked on the first national tour and traveled with Tony Award-winning director John Tiffany and Music Supervisor Martin Lowe to cast productions overseas.

In 2015 he directed Peter and the Starcatcher for Virginia Repertory Theatre. In that same year he joined Glass Half Full, best known for producing The Curious Incident of the Dog in the Night-Time (play), as their Director of New Plays, identifying future projects.

In July 2016, he became Artistic Director of Virginia Repertory Theatre. During his four year tenure at Virginia Rep, Nathaniel directed the World Premiere of The End of War by David L. Robbins, the regional premiere of In the Heights, the World Premiere of River Ditty by Matthew Mooney Keuter, West Side Story, Curious Incident of the Dog in the Night-time, The 39 Steps, and Once (a co-production with The Fulton Theatre.  

In October 2021, alongside Executive Director Vida Williams, Shaw launched The New Theatre in Richmond, Virginia, devoted to advancing art form and industry, with a primary focus on new play development.

Personal life
Shaw is married to choreographer and dancer Lisa Rumbauskas.

External links 
 NathanielShaw.net
 Virginia Rep leadership
 Glass Half Full Productions
 The Active Theatre media and news

References 

20th-century American male actors
American choreographers
American musical theatre directors
American theatre directors
American male dancers
American male stage actors
Living people
People from Menlo Park, California
University of Northern Colorado alumni
Year of birth missing (living people)